The 1933 New York Giants season was the franchise's 51st season. The team won the National League pennant and defeated the American League (AL) pennant winner Washington Senators in the World Series in five games.

Offseason
 December 29, 1932: Shanty Hogan was purchased from the Giants by the Boston Braves.

Regular season

Season standings

Record vs. opponents

Opening Day lineup

Roster

Player stats

Batting

Starters by position
Note: Pos = Position; G = Games played; AB = At bats; H = Hits; Avg. = Batting average; HR = Home runs; RBI = Runs batted in

Other batters
Note: G = Games played; AB = At bats; H = Hits; Avg. = Batting average; HR = Home runs; RBI = Runs batted in

Pitching

Starting pitchers
Note: G = Games pitched; IP = Innings pitched; W = Wins; L = Losses; ERA = Earned run average; SO = Strikeouts

Other pitchers
Note: G = Games pitched; IP = Innings pitched; W = Wins; L = Losses; ERA = Earned run average; SO = Strikeouts

Relief pitchers
Note: G = Games pitched; W = Wins; L = Losses; SV = Saves; ERA = Earned run average; SO = Strikeouts

World series

Game 1
October 3, 1933, at the Polo Grounds in New York City

Game 2
October 4, 1933, at the Polo Grounds in New York City

Game 3
October 5, 1933, at Griffith Stadium in Washington, D.C.

Game 4
October 6, 1933, at Griffith Stadium in Washington, D.C.

Game 5
October 7, 1933, at Griffith Stadium in Washington, D.C.

Awards and honors
Carl Hubbell, Associated Press Athlete of the Year

Farm system

Attleboro club moved to Lawrence, May 26, 1933, and then to Woonsocket, July 18

References

External links
 1933 New York Giants team page at Baseball Reference
 1933 New York Giants team page at Baseball Almanac

New York Giants (NL)
San Francisco Giants seasons
New York Giants season
National League champion seasons
World Series champion seasons
New York Giants (MLB)
1930s in Manhattan
Washington Heights, Manhattan